Philippine vehicle registration plates have a long history. The earliest license plates were introduced around 1912 with the introduction of Legislative Act No. 2159.

In this article, "L" stands for a letter in 1974–1980 and 1981 series plates, "X" stands for an alphanumeric symbol (in 1974–1980 license plates), "P" stands for a prefix (in 1933–1980 license plates), and "D" stands for a number (in all license plates).

Specifications

Early license plates 
Most early license plates just showed the serial number, most likely a 4 to 5-digit number and a small box on the left of the serial number which displays the 2-digit year mark, which is written downwards. This continued until 1932.

e.g. 31 44789, 31 stands for the year 1931

1933 series 
With the Revised Motor Vehicle Law (Act No. 3992) introduced in 1933, second-generation Philippine license plates were introduced; they can be in the format of "A-B" or "P-B", where A is an area code number (used until 1960), P is a vehicle classification prefix, and B is a 3 to 6-digit number. Sometimes single-letter suffixes were used.

Hyphens were used in separating the numbers; this was later replaced by asterisks in 1938. On the bottom of the license plate are the 2-digit year mark, the place the car is registered, and the word "P.I.", in that order (e.g. "36 MANILA P.I.", 36 stands for 1936). In 1938 the "P.I." was dropped, the place name and the year mark were simply displayed (e.g. MANILA 60, 60 stands for 1960).  Prefixes were common in license plates starting in 1938. Sometimes prefixes stand for place names (e.g. "PS" stands for Pasay).

1934 – white symbols on green background
For government vehicles, the plate has a shield outline with the 2-digit year mark (sometimes written downward) inside it, then the word "P.I." below, then a 2 or 3-digit number on the right of the shield outline, and then the word "PHILIPPINES" on the bottom of the license plate.
1935 – yellow symbols on a black background with the original (1933) numbering format
1936 – red symbols on a white background with original numbering format
1937 – white symbols on dark blue background
1938 – green symbols on a white background with a revised numbering format and bottom text.
Instead of "(year) (place) P.I.", the bottom text is displayed as "(place) (year)", sometimes with an asterisk or hyphen dividing the words. Prefixes on license plates came into use.
1939 – black symbols on white background with second numbering format
1940 – red symbols on a yellow background with the second numbering format
1941 – yellow symbols on blue background with the second numbering format
1942 – white symbols on a black background
Manila license plates omit the "1" prefix from this point on.
1944 – white on red
1945 – yellow on green
1946 – dark blue symbols on a yellow-orange background
On some license plates, there were two-year markers (e.g. 46*PHILIPPINES*46).
1947 – same format as 1936 license plates (red on white) but with 2nd (1938) numbering format
1948 – black symbols on pink background
1949 – white on red
1950 – white symbols on a green background
Typeface was slightly changed and a new numbering format was used. On license plates with two numbers, the left number is smaller than the right number.
Motorcycle plates now have the prefix of "MC".
1951 – yellow symbols on a dark brown background
1952 – white symbols on a dark blue background
1953 – white symbols on red background
1954 – white symbols on green background (similar to 1950 license plates)
1955 – same format as 1942 license plates (white on black) but with the 3rd (1950) numbering format
Diplomatic plates for that year were black on white.
1956 – same format as 1953 license plates (white on red)
Starting that year, the font on the bottom of the license plates has been slightly modified.
1957 – same format as 1952 plates (white on dark blue)
1958 – white symbols on maroon background
1959 – white symbols on orange background
1960 – white symbols on green background (same format as 1950 and 1954 plates)
1961 – a new numbering format and color set has been used. Above the serial number is "RIZAL'S CENTENARY YEAR", and on the right of the plate is a decal depicting the Rizal Monument.
Standard format (B, E, H, J, L, MC, T, TR, etc.) – white symbols on red-orange background
Public transport (PUB, PUJ, TX)- white symbols on black background
Government use (RP series)- white symbols on black background
Rental vehicle (U) – white on maroon
1962
Standard format – white symbols on maroon background
Public transport – white symbols on blue background
Government use – white symbols on orange background
Service vehicle (S) – white on turquoise
Unusual variant(s) – yellow symbols on red background
1963
Standard format – white symbols on green background
Public transport – white symbols on red background
Government use – white on orange
Service vehicle – white on black
Rental vehicle – white on red
Unusual variant(s) – yellow symbols on gray background
1964 – the text above the serial number reads "MABINI CENTENNIAL"
Standard format – white symbols on blue background
Public transport- white on black
Government use – white on black
Service vehicle – white on blue
Rental vehicle – white on black
Unusual variant(s) – yellow symbols on gray background
1965 – the text above the serial number reads "CHRISTIANIZATION'S 4TH CENTENNIAL"
Standard format – white symbols on orange background
Government use – white on black
1966
Standard format – blue symbols on white background
Public transport – black on yellow
Pickup truck (AC) – black on yellow
Diplomatic use (DC, CC, etc.) – white on blue
1967
Instead of new color schemes for the years 1967–1969, date tabs (with a 2-digit year marker) were inserted on the lower-right corner of a 1966-subseries plate. The use of these tabs continued until 1969.

1970 series 
In 1970, Philippine vehicle license plates adapted a numbering format similar to Japanese license plates. It can be in a format of "DD-DD", (from 0–0 to 99–99, sometimes 00 to 09 are used) with single or double-letter suffixes. Most vehicle category prefixes are on the lower-left of the plate. For government vehicles, "RP" is displayed before the number. Year stickers were introduced in 1973.

1974 series 
A new license plate format was introduced for the year 1974. The format is "L DDD", "DDD L", "XX DDD" or "DDD XX", with the vehicle classification at the lower-left corner of the plate, followed by the place name (which was changed to "PILIPINAS" in 1977), and the 2-digit year marker. The initial typeface resembles the 1970 series plates. (e.g. G 582, 159 F, FE 358, 576 NK)

1977
The typeface and color schemes were changed.
1980
The color schemes were changed again.

1981 series 
In 1981, the vehicle registration plate system has been revised again, taking the format of  LLL-DDD. Color-coded year stickers appear for the first time in 1982, based on the license plate's color scheme (notable exceptions are in 1983, 1984, 1986, 1988, 1989, 1990 and 1993). Stickers for vehicle classification appeared in the same year. The byline at the bottom of the plate was displayed as "PILIPINAS" ("Philippines").
1988
The license plates are slightly redesigned.
Sometimes, an "F" between the "LLL-DDD" serial number indicates a front plate; an "R" indicates a rear plate.
Public transport plates are usually displayed as yellow symbols on a black background (front and rear plates).
For other license plates, the rear plates have the inverted colors of the front plates.
1994
The license plates have slightly reverted to the 1981 format; in 1995, most license plates had started the byline displayed as "PHILIPPINES 2000".
2000
Most license plates have the byline displayed as "Angat Pinoy 2004" ("Raising Philippines 2004"), "PILIPINAS", or "PERLAS NG SILANGAN" ("Pearl of the East").
2003
The license plates were completely redesigned, with the background being a blue/white/green gradient with a picture of the Rizal Monument in the center.
A few license plates have the byline displayed as "MATATAG NA REPUBLIKA" ("Strong Republic"); most have it displayed as "PILIPINAS" or "PERLAS NG SILANGAN".
Some public transport license plates have a blue/yellow/green gradient background with the Rizal Monument picture in the center (mostly with 2003 subseries letterings) or a golden yellow background with the lettering similar to 1987 subseries license plates.
2005
3-year validation stickers appear for the first time.
2009
For NCR Plates, The letters, "I","O" & "Q", will display either in the middle or end.

2014 series 
In January 2013, Land Transportation Office ventures the plate standardization project that will redesign the plates and will include new safety features, regions will now be indicated at the bottom of the plate number with a bar code at the top left of the plate. The color of the new plate is changed to white on black with the new format LLL-DDDD for light motor vehicles and LL-DDDDD for motorcycles.

2018 series 
In July of 2018, the Land Transportation Office released a newly updated plate simplifying the 2014 series. The new font of the plate is FE-Schrift. The plate no longer indicates the region below it, instead, the first prefix of the plate will indicate the region of where the vehicle is registered, bringing back the 1981 license plate series alphabetical designation. At the right bottom of the plate is where the small QR code is located.

2020
New larger motorcycle plates with a DDD-LLL format were released in 2020 for the 2018 series plates. The plate consists of color-coded strip with a QR code in the middle, every color and whether the position of the strip is at the top or bottom of the plate will indicate the region where it is registered.

2023
New format released L-DDD-LL for motorcycles.

Lists of prefixes 
In 1938, prefixes were common on license plates. Prefixes can be combined (e.g. RPTR, which denotes a government-owned trailer). Most of the prefixes took the form of stickers starting in 1981.

Vehicle category prefixes 
A – Agent (dealer)
AC – auto calesa jeepney
B – "bantam" / kei car
CC – diplomatic vehicle (from "consular corps")
CD – diplomatic vehicle (from French "Corps Diplomatique")
CM – Chief of Mission's (ambassador's) vehicle
DC – diplomatic vehicle (from "diplomatic corps")
DD – diplomatic vehicle
DPL – diplomatic vehicle
E – tax-exempt vehicle
G – garage (dealer)
H – heavy vehicle (with large engine displacement of 2801 cc and over)
J – jeep
L – light vehicle (with small engine displacement of 1600 cc or less  )
M – medium vehicle (with medium engine displacement of 1601 – 2800 cc)
MC – motorcycle
MCH – motorcycle for hire
N – SUV's
OEV – other exempt vehicle
PI – government use (from Philippine Islands)
PU – public transport (PUB stands for "public utility bus"; it should not be confused with the B prefix which stands for a bantam car)
PUB – public utility bus
PUJ – public utility jeepney
R – Rental Vehicle
RP – government vehicle (from Republika ng Pilipinas or Republic of the Philippines)
S – service van or bus
SPL – special designation
T – truck
TB – tour bus
TC (1942) – cargo truck
TC – tricycle
TEMP/TMP – temporary
TH – truck for hire
TX/TAXI – taxicab
TR – trailer
TRJ – jeep trailer
TRLB – Truck
U – Undertaker (funeral vehicle)/Hearse
UV – utility vehicle (also includes sport-utility vehicles and vans)

Place prefixes

1981 series 
A – Ilocos Region and Cordillera Administrative Region – (1981–2014); (2000–2014)
B – Cagayan Valley Region – (1981–2014)
C – Central Luzon – (1981–2003)
D – Calabarzon and Mimaropa – (1981–2000)
E – Bicol Region – (1981–2014)
F – Western Visayas – (1981–2014)
G – Central Visayas – (1981–2004)
H – Eastern Visayas – (1981–2014)
J – Zamboanga Peninsula and Bangsamoro Autonomous Region in Muslim Mindanao – (1981–2014)
K – Northern Mindanao – (1981–2014)
L – Davao Region and Caraga – (1981–2014); (2000–2014)
M – Soccsksargen- (1981–2014)
N – National Capital Region – (1981–1982); (2009–2010)
P – National Capital Region – (1982–1991); (2010–2011)
R – Central Luzon – (2003–2014)
S – Government-owned Vehicles
T – National Capital Region – (1991–1995); (2011–2012)
U – National Capital Region – (1995–1997); (2012–2013)
V – Calabarzon and Mimaropa – (2000–2014)
W – National Capital Region – (1997–2001); (2013–2014)
X – National Capital Region – (2001–2005)
Y – Central Visayas – (2004–2014)
Z – National Capital Region – (2005–2009)

I & O are not used to avoid confusion with the numbers 1 & 0, used only
for private motorcycles.
Q is a special letter and is not used on regular plate circulation or used only
for motorcycle-tricycle for hire.
But these Letters are now used as middle or last letters, or both for Manila Plates since 2009.
O & Q was also used For provincial plates in Central Visayas in the middle of 2010. (e.g.  YJO-248, YJQ-768)
From 2014, XAI-ZQZ for Manila plates was not used.

2014 series 

From April 13, 2014 to June 30, 2016, the plate number letters are all the same throughout the Philippines in a series and combination, since the region where it is registered is now displayed in the new license plates at the bottom part.

AA(A,H-K,L-Q,W-Z), A(B-D,E,F,G-L,O-T,V)A, AB(C-H, O-T) – National Capital Region
AA(A,R,S,U), A(L,V)A, ABI – Ilocos Region
AA(K,U), ADA, AB(N) – Cordillera Administrative Region
AA(A,U), ALA, ABI – Cagayan Valley Region
AA(B,Q-R,U-V), A(F.L-M,V-W)A, AB(B,I-K) – Central Luzon
AA(B-D,V-W), A(E,W-X)A, ABL – Calabarzon
AAD, A(B,F-G,M,X)A, ABL – Bicol Region
AA(D,R), A(B,M-N,X)A, ABM – Western Visayas
AA(D-F,Z), A(F,X)A, AB(M-N) – Central Visayas
AA(F,W), A(B,F)A, ABN – Eastern Visayas
AA(F,R,T), A(F,N,X)A, ABU – Zamboanga Peninsula
AA(F,R-S,U), A(F,N)A, AB(B-C) – Northern Mindanao
AA(F-G-H)- Davao Region
AA(H,S,T-U), A(B,G,N-O)A, AB(U-V) – Soccsksargen
AA(L,U), A(D,F)A, ABB – Caraga

2018 series 

Registered vehicles from July 1, 2016 and beyond will have the same alphabetical designation as in the 1981 license plate series.

I – Ilocos Region
B – Cagayan Valley Region
C – Central Luzon
D – Calabarzon
E – Bicol Region
F – Western Visayas
G – Central Visayas
H – Eastern Visayas
J – Zamboanga Peninsula
K – Northern Mindanao
L – Davao Region
M – Soccsksargen
N – National Capital Region
O – Bangsamoro Autonomous Region in Muslim Mindanao
S – Government-owned Vehicles
V – Mimaropa
Y – Cordillera Administrative Region
Z – Caraga

Regional issued plates (1981 series)

Metro Manila 
Private (plate series with approximate year issued):

I, O and Q were originally excluded to avoid confusion with the numbers "1" & "0". But with the exhaustion of the "Z" series in 2009, they were used by reverting to the old "N" series. A new serial scheme was implemented using these characters, instead of the third letter coming into series (e.g. after ZAA-999 has been reached, ZAB-101) the middle letter is the one being replaced (e.g. after NAI-999 series has been exhausted, NBI-101 will follow.) These include combinations for public utility vehicles (middle letters V-Y) and trailers (middle letters U and Z), which were repurposed for private vehicles. After all the possible combinations with I, O and Q as the third letter for the same starting letter have been used, I, O and Q are used as middle letters and the third letter is being replaced (e.g. After NIA-999 has been used, NIB-101 will follow), if the reverted letter is exhausted (e.g. After PQZ-999 has been used, TAI-101 will follow). During 2013, some letter combinations (e.g. FJB-101) were also used in Metro Manila.

E.g.: NFD-838, PAX-329, PGU-909, TAX-798, TFN-697, UTH-468, WBU-389, WSD-220, XAF-789, XDG-289, XHK-537, XJA-993, XJJ-218, XKW-594, XLA-475, XMS-907, XNL-812, XPZ-901 XSC-769, ZCZ-679, NUI-205, NJO-542, NBQ-217, NIA-101, NOR-686, NQZ-544, PXI-296, PSO-338, PQQ-332, PIK-342, POC-902, PQL-497, TEI-517, TZO-390, TSQ-486, TIT-120, TOL-979, TQH-924, UMI-615, UFO-392, UHQ-571, UIP-207, UOG-874, UQF-281, WAI-365, WOO-911, WEQ-451, WIC-143, WOP-723, WQL-856

Special Issue: EBX-578, FJB-357, HBG-257

Provincial 
Private (plate series with approximate year issued):

1981–1989
   

1990–1999
   

2000–2009
   

2010–2014

Regional issued plates (2014 & 2018 series)

Metro Manila 

Private (plate series with approximate year issued):

Provincial 

Private (plate series with approximate year issued):

2014–2019
   

2020–present

Regional issued yellow plates

Metro Manila 

Public (plate series with approximate year issued):

*Vehicles registered from July 1, 2016 onwards are currently using private plates (white) since yellow plates are still in production.
Note: Plate Numbers: with N P T U with V W X Y using the increments of I O Q are private plates.

Provincial 

Public (plate series with approximate year issued):

*Vehicles registered from July 1, 2016 onwards currently uses private plates (white) since yellow plates are in production.

Government-owned issued plates 

Government (plate series with approximate year issued):
 
*Vehicles registered from 2020 onwards are currently using conduction sticker plates since red plates are still in production.

Note: Government plate numbers from SLJ-101 (including increments of "I", "O" and "Q") up to SZZ-999 were skipped.

Regional issued trailer plates

Metro Manila 

*Trailer Plates with increments of "I", "O", and "Q" series were commonly used for private vehicles from 2009 to 2014.

Provincial 

*Trailers registered from 2016 onwards currently use 6-Numbered plates as trailer plates are not yet in production.

Yellow Plates in Metro Manila and Provincial 
Metro Manila

Provincial

*Trailers registered from 2016 onwards currently use 6-Numbered plates as trailer plates are not yet in production.

Note: AZA-AZD, EZA-EZC, IZA-IZE, OZA-OZE And UZA-UZB are used for Electric Vehicles.

Regional issued motorcycle plates

Metro Manila 
 Private Motorcycle (MC):

 Private Motor Tricycle (TC):

Public Motor Tricycle (TC):

* Format DDD-LLL (e.g. 123-NAA, 456-NOA & 789-NVA)

* Format L-DDD-LL (e.g. N-123-AA, N-456-OA & N-789-VA)

** Yellow plates are in production.

Provincial 
 Private Motorcycle (MC):

* Format DDD-LLL (e.g. 123-NAA)

* Format L-DDD-LL (e.g. N-123-AA)

 Private Motor Tricycle (TC)

 Public Motor Tricycle (TC)

Note: For 2016 Updated Motorcycle Plate Numbers, Motorcycle and Tricycle Plates have U and Z for Private or V, W, X and Y for For-Hire Tricycles in the Middle of the Letter Block.

* Uses MV file numbers or Temporary Plates since White plates are in production.
** Uses MV file numbers or Temporary Plates since Yellow plates are in production.

Gallery

References 

Pictures of Philippine license plates from Francoplaque

Road transportation in the Philippines
Philippines History
 Registration plates